The 2006 RCA Championships was a tennis tournament played on outdoor hard courts. It was the 19th edition of the event known that year as the RCA Championships, and was part of the International Series of the 2006 ATP Tour. It took place at the Indianapolis Tennis Center in Indianapolis, Indiana, United States, from July 17 through July 24, 2006. It was the first event of the 2004 US Open series.

The singles draw featured Americans James Blake (seeded #3), Andy Roddick (2003 U.S. Open champion – #2) and Robby Ginepri (#4) as three of the top four seeds. It also featured Delray Beach and Los Angeles winner Tommy Haas, Fernando González, Dmitry Tursunov and former grand slam finalist Marat Safin.

Finals

Singles

 James Blake defeated  Andy Roddick, 4–6, 6–4, 7–6(7–5)
It was James Blake's 3rd title of the year, and his 6th overall.

Doubles

 Bobby Reynolds /  Andy Roddick defeated  Paul Goldstein /  Jim Thomas, 6–4, 6–4

References

External links
Official website
Singles draw
Doubles draw